Caroline B. Nichols (1864-1939) was an American violinist, conductor and founder of the Fadette Ladies Orchestra (known as the Fadettes of Boston). Along with Emma Roberto Steiner, she is credited as one of the first women in the United States to make a successful career out of conducting musical performances.

Nichols was a founding member of Marion Osgood's Ladies Orchestra, however about four years later she was a founding member of the Fadettes of Boston in 1888, a sextet, including Ethel Atwood. She quickly rose from first violin to conductor as the small group became a chamber orchestra, assuming leadership in 1890. She led the Fadettes for more than thirty years. The group played and toured until 1920 and played more than 6000 concerts. As a child, she studied violin with Julius Eichberg, Leopold Lichtenberg, and Charles Loeffler. Nichols eventually retired to Boston and trained orchestra members and was instrumental in helping women to be financial independent. 
She died in Boston in 1939.

External links

References 

1864 births
1939 deaths
American conductors (music)
American violinists
Women conductors (music)
Founders of early music ensembles
Women founders